The women's shot put competition at the 1968 Summer Olympics in Mexico City, Mexico took place on October 20.

Competition format
The competition consisted of a single round. Each competitor was allowed three throws, with the top eight athletes after that point being given three further attempts.

Records
Prior to the competition, the existing World and Olympic records were as follows.

Results

References

External links
 Official Olympic Report, la84foundation.org. Retrieved August 16, 2012.

Athletics at the 1968 Summer Olympics
Shot put at the Olympics
1968 in women's athletics
Women's events at the 1968 Summer Olympics